"Rebel-'Rouser" is a rock and roll instrumental song written by Duane Eddy and Lee Hazlewood and originally released on Jamie Records in 1958 by "Duane Eddy and his 'twangy' guitar" as a single (Jamie 1104) with "Stalkin'" on its B-side. Both tracks were produced by Lester Sill and Lee Hazlewood.

It was Eddy's third single as a solo artist, following the 1957 release of the single "Ramrod"/"Caravan" on the Ford record label (a release that was credited to "Duane Eddy and His Rock-A-Billies", although Al Casey (who wrote "Ramrod") actually played lead guitar on both tracks) and which was followed in 1958 by the release of the "Moovin' n' Groovin'"/"Up And Down" single on Jamie (Jamie 1101), which was also released as "Duane Eddy and his 'twangy' guitar". "Rebel-'Rouser" also appeared on Duane Eddy's debut album, Have 'Twangy' Guitar Will Travel.

The song was originally called "Rabble Rouser" by Duane Eddy when it was recorded at Clay Ramsey and his son Floyd's "Audio Recorders" recording studio in Phoenix, Arizona, but the song's title was later changed by Lee Hazlewood to "Rebel-'Rouser" and the song charted at number 6 on the Billboard Hot 100. On Billboard's R&B Best Sellers chart, "Rebel-'Rouser" went to number 8.

Background
The tune, Eddy has noted, was not based on "When the Saints Go Marching In" as many assumed, but was loosely inspired by "Who’s Gonna Shoe Your Pretty Little Feet", an old folk song Eddy knew from a Tennessee Ernie Ford record. Eddy has spoken of listening to Ford's recording for inspiration on the morning of the recording session for "Rabble Rouser" (the song's title was later changed by producer Lee Hazlewood to "Rebel-'Rouser").

The track was recorded at Clay Ramsey and his son Floyd's Audio Recorders recording studio at 3830 North 7th Street in Phoenix, Arizona and featured Eddy playing lead guitar on his Gretsch 6120 guitar that he played through a modified 100 watt Magnatone amplifier.
Hazlewood then took the recording tape to the Gold Star Studios in Los Angeles, where he had Gil Bernal overdub his saxophone lines and added singing and handclaps performed by the Sharps, a vocal group that would later change its name to The Rivingtons and that would have hits of its own in the early 1960s, "Papa-Oom-Mow-Mow" in 1962 and "The Bird's the Word" in 1963.

The tune changes keys three times, the introduction starts in E major and transposes to F major, then F-sharp major, and finally to G major.

Personnel
 Duane Eddy, electric lead guitar.
 Buddy Wheeler, electric "click" bass
 Jimmy Simmons, acoustic bass
 Bob Taylor, drums
 Al Casey, piano
 Donnie Owens, Corki Casey O’Dell, rhythm guitars
 Gil Bernal, saxophone
 The Sharps, background vocals, rebel yells, handclaps
 Lester Sill, Lee Hazlewood, producers
 Jack Miller, recording engineer (Audio Recorders studio, Phoenix, Arizona)

Song in popular culture
Featured in 1993 movie The Sandlot.
Featured in the 1994 movie Forrest Gump and on the film's soundtrack.
Heard in the 2010 video game Mafia II.
Appears in 2018 video game Far Cry 5.

References

External links
  Interview with GuitarPlayer magazine, 2020: "Duane Eddy: How I Wrote "Rebel-'Rouser"
 Original issue on Jamie, 1958
 Allmusic song review

Duane Eddy songs
Songs written by Duane Eddy
Songs written by Lee Hazlewood
1958 singles
Rock instrumentals
1958 songs
Jamie Records singles
1950s instrumentals